Miodrag Medan (born 27 April 1970) is a Bosnian Serb former footballer who played as a forward for clubs in Yugoslavia and Greece.

Club career
Born in Mostar, SR Bosnia and Herzegovina, SFR Yugoslavia, Medan began his career playing for local side FK Lokomotiva Mostar. He would spend the next few seasons in Serbian football with FK Bačka (BP) and FK Rad.

In December 1995, Medan joined Greek first division side Paniliakos F.C. for six months, appearing in 19 league matches for the club. He moved to Greek second division side Panionios F.C. for the following two seasons, helping the club promote to the first division where he led the team in goal-scoring and won the Greek Cup in his second season.

Medan would spend the rest of his playing career in the lower levels of Greek football, leading the second division in goal-scoring while at PAS Giannina F.C. in the 1998–99 season. He also played for Ethnikos Piraeus F.C., Panelefsiniakos F.C., Ilisiakos F.C. and Athinaida Kypseli F.C. before retiring.

Honours
Panionios
 Greek Cup: 1997–98

References

1970 births
Living people
Sportspeople from Mostar
Serbs of Bosnia and Herzegovina
Association football forwards
Bosnia and Herzegovina footballers
OFK Bačka players
FK Rad players
Paniliakos F.C. players
Panionios F.C. players
PAS Giannina F.C. players
Ethnikos Piraeus F.C. players
Panelefsiniakos F.C. players
Ilisiakos F.C. players
First League of Serbia and Montenegro players
Super League Greece players
Football League (Greece) players
Bosnia and Herzegovina expatriate footballers
Expatriate footballers in Greece
Bosnia and Herzegovina expatriate sportspeople in Greece
PAOK FC non-playing staff